Apache Mall is the largest enclosed shopping mall in Rochester, Minnesota. It was built in 1969 at the intersection of U.S. Route 52 and U.S. Route 14. The Mall's food court has had free Wi-Fi access provided by Charter Communications since January 2007.  Apache Mall is owned and managed by Brookfield Properties, who acquired General Growth Properties in 2018. The mall's anchor stores are Scheels All Sports, Barnes & Noble, Macy's, and JCPenney. Boston Shoe & Boot Repair, Orangetheory Fitness, and Men's Wearhouse are junior anchors. There is 1 vacant anchor store that was once Herberger's. In 2014, the mall's Sears store was closed. However, shortly after the Sears was shut down, plans for a Scheels All Sports were announced, as well as an expansion of the building. Scheels opened in 2015. On April 18, 2018, it was announced that Herberger's would be closing as parent company The Bon-Ton Stores was going out of business. The store closed on August 29, 2018.

History
Apache Mall opened on October 16, 1969, on a 99-acre plot of former farmland purchased from George Baihly. The original anchors were JCPenney and Montgomery Ward. By the mid-1960s, southwest Rochester had grown significantly, with the extension of U.S. Route 52 past U.S. Route 14 (which had been the highway's termination point for a few years). The extension of the freeway helped extend the city's "belt-line" in some respects with a push south.  Suburban development had taken hold by this point and over the next twenty-five years, the area would grow quite a bit. The construction of the mall was a tipping point of moving commerce from downtown Rochester in a changing retail landscape.

Dayton-Hudson Corporation (later Target Corporation) moved the local branch of their Dayton's department store chain to a newly constructed 150,000 sq. ft. store at Apache Mall, from its former downtown Rochester, Minnesota location, in 1972. At that time Apache Mall was the third-largest shopping center in Minnesota.  Sears opened a new store at the mall in 1991. In 2001, Montgomery Ward closed its doors and was later replaced by Herberger's. In that same year, the Dayton's location at Apache Mall would eventually take on the Marshall Field's nameplate after acquiring the store chain in a merger; and would ultimately be rebranded as Macy's after the selling of Marshall Field's to Federated Stores.

References

External links 
Official site

Shopping malls in Minnesota
Buildings and structures in Rochester, Minnesota
Brookfield Properties
Tourist attractions in Olmsted County, Minnesota
Shopping malls established in 1969
1969 establishments in Minnesota